Rizwan is an Arabic name and surname.

It may refer to:
 Riḍwan also spelled Rezwan or Rizwan, the angel in charge of maintaining Jannah or Paradise in Islam

Athletes
Rizwan Akram, a Dutch cricket umpire and former player
Rizwan Asif, a Pakistani football player
Rizwan Azam, a Pakistani badminton player
Rizwan Cheema (b. 1978), a Pakistani-Canadian cricket player
Rizwan Latif, a Pakistani-born United Arab Emirates cricket player
Rizwan Mahmood, a Danish cricket player
Rizwan Tanweer, an Italian cricket player

Pakistani cricket players
Rizwan Ahmed (cricketer, born 1976), a Pakistani cricket player
Rizwan Akbar (b. 1986), a Pakistani cricket player
Rizwan Ali ( 1999), a Pakistani cricket player
Rizwan Haider (b. 1985), a Pakistani cricket player
Rizwan Hussain (cricketer) (b. 1996), a Pakistani cricket player
Rizwan Malik (b. 1990), a Pakistani cricket player
Rizwan Saeed (cricketer) (b. 1978), a Pakistani cricket player
Rizwan-uz-Zaman (b. 1961), a former Pakistani cricket player

Entertainment and media
Rizwan Butt, a Pakistani singer-songwriter
Rizwan Ali Jaffri, a Pakistani model, actor and singer
Rizwan Khan, a British broadcaster
Rizwan Manji, a Canadian actor
Rizwan-ul-Haq, a Pakistani musician
Rizwan Wasti (1937–2011), a Pakistani broadcaster
Mawaan Rizwan (born 1992), a Pakistani-born British actor, writer and comedian

Politics and civil service
Rizwan Akhtar, a retired Pakistan Army general
Rizwan Arshad, an Indian politician for the Indian National Congress party
Rizwan Ahmad Khan, and Indian politician for the Peace Party of India
Rizwan Zaheer, an Indian politician for the Bahujan Samaj Party

Other people
 Rizwan Ahmed (disambiguation)
Rizwan Farook, a Pakistani - American domestic terrorist
Rizwan Hussain, a Bangladeshi-born British human rights lawyer
Rizwanur Rahman (1977–2007), an Indian victim of a suspicious death
Ramzan Rizwan, Pakistani tissue seller and murderer

Other uses
Rizwan, Iran, a village in Iran
Rizwan Mosque, in Portland, Oregon

See also
 Muhammad Rizwan (disambiguation)
Rizwan-Muazzam, a Pakistani musical group
 Ridvan